The Church of Our Lady Queen of Angels is a former Roman Catholic parish church under the authority of the Roman Catholic Archdiocese of New York, located at 228 East 113th Street in Manhattan, New York City. The parish was established in 1886 and was staffed by the Capuchin Friars; the parish closed in 2007. The Archdiocese announced on January 19, 2007, the church's closure.

References 

Religious organizations established in 1886
Closed churches in the Roman Catholic Archdiocese of New York
Closed churches in New York City
Roman Catholic churches in Manhattan
Churches in Harlem
1886 establishments in New York (state)
2007 disestablishments in New York (state)